Interstate 94 (I-94) in the US state of Minnesota runs  east–west through the central portion of the state. The highway connects the cities of Moorhead, Fergus Falls, Alexandria, St. Cloud, Minneapolis, and Saint Paul. Authorized in 1956, it was mostly constructed in the 1960s.

Route description

I-94 enters the state from North Dakota at the city of Moorhead and heads southeast after serving Moorhead.

Traveling southeast from Moorhead, there are several places where the elevation of I-94 rises slightly; these are "beaches" that formed as the glacial lake rose or fell. Finally, at Rothsay, I-94 climbs the last beach line and enters terrain more typical for Minnesota. From Rothsay to the Twin Cities, the terrain of I-94 is rolling with frequent lakes visible from the highway.

I-94 traverses by Fergus Falls, Alexandria, and Sauk Centre on its way to St. Cloud. The "original main street" in Sauk Centre near I-94 commemorates the Sinclair Lewis novel that skewered this town.

Monticello is roughly the midpoint exurb for both St. Cloud and Minneapolis. Between exits 201 (Albertville) and 194 (Monticello) sits the Minnesota Road Research Facility.

Upon arrival to the Twin Cities, I-94 first approaches Minneapolis from the north, then the highway turns east after passing through the Lowry Hill Tunnel and heads to Saint Paul while traveling east.

The road crosses the Mississippi River in Minneapolis between the Prospect Park and Seward neighborhoods. The highway joins Minneapolis and Saint Paul together where it meets Minnesota State Highway 280 (MN 280). In Saint Paul, the routing of I-94 is set through the historic Rondo Neighborhood, which, prior to the highway's construction, was the largest Black community in Saint Paul.

Upon leaving Saint Paul, the route travels through suburban Washington County and exits the state into Wisconsin between Lakeland, Minnesota, and Hudson, Wisconsin, while crossing the St. Croix River.

Legally, the Minnesota section of I-94 is defined as unmarked Legislative Route 392 in the Minnesota Statutes § 161.12(4). I-94 is not marked with this legislative number along the actual highway.

History
I-94 in Minnesota was authorized as part of the original Interstate System in 1956. It was mostly constructed in the 1960s.

I-94 follows the original route of old US Highway 52 (US 52) from Moorhead to St. Cloud, then I-94 stays south of the Mississippi River along the former route of old MN 152 between St. Cloud and the Twin Cities. I-94 then passes through both downtowns and exits toward Wisconsin along the former route of old US 12.

The first section of I-94 in Minnesota constructed was between Moorhead and Albany in the early 1960s, as an extension of the existing highway in North Dakota.

The section of I-94 between Minneapolis and Saint Paul was completed in 1968 and dedicated December 9. In the Twin Cities, the construction of the highway was politically charged. The highway was built primarily through many working-class and Black neighborhoods. In Saint Paul, the routing of I-94 displaced the historic Rondo Neighborhood, which, prior to the highway's construction, was the largest Black community in Saint Paul.

The section of I-94 between Maple Grove and Brooklyn Center was completed in 1969.

The section of I-94 between St. Augusta and Maple Grove was completed in 1973.

The section of I-94 between Albany and St. Augusta was completed in 1977.

The section of I-94 from Brooklyn Center through north Minneapolis was completed in 1984. Like the Rondo Neighborhood in the 1960s, this segment was through a primarily Black and working-class neighborhood.

This was completed in 1985.

In 2004, a major traffic bottleneck was relieved when a third lane was constructed between Brooklyn Boulevard at Brooklyn Center and Hemlock Lane at Maple Grove. This is located immediately east of the I-494/I-694/I-94 interchange in Maple Grove, also known locally as the Fish Lake Interchange.

From September 2007 to October 2008, the Minnesota Department of Transportation (MnDOT) added a temporary extra lane to I-94 between northbound I-35W and MN 280 in the Twin Cities to help relieve traffic congestion caused by the collapse of the I-35W Mississippi River bridge. As a result, this portion of I-94 was not up to Interstate Highway standards during this time period.

Rethinking I-94
In 2016, MnDOT launched a project known as Rethinking I-94, which is aimed at reconnecting neighborhoods, revitalizing communities, and ensuring that residents have a voice in transportation decisions. The construction of I-94 between Minneapolis and Saint Paul was seen as controversial and has been a political debate for many years. MnDOT is planning to reconnect those neighborhoods that were destroyed and separated in 1960.

Exit list

Auxiliary routes
I-394, direct link between Minneapolis and western suburbs
I-494, southern/western portion of beltway loop
I-694, northern/eastern portion of beltway loop

References

External links

Steve Riner Details of Routes 76 to 100. Unofficial Minnesota Highways Page.

 Minnesota
94
Transportation in Clay County, Minnesota
Transportation in Wilkin County, Minnesota
Transportation in Otter Tail County, Minnesota
Transportation in Grant County, Minnesota
Transportation in Douglas County, Minnesota
Transportation in Todd County, Minnesota
Transportation in Stearns County, Minnesota
Transportation in Wright County, Minnesota
Transportation in Hennepin County, Minnesota
Transportation in Ramsey County, Minnesota
Transportation in Washington County, Minnesota